Laura H. Carnell School is an historic elementary school located in the Oxford Circle neighborhood of Philadelphia, Pennsylvania at 1100 Devereaux Avenue. It is part of the School District of Philadelphia. The building was designed by Irwin T. Catharine and built in 1930–1931. It is a three-story, eight-bay, brick building on a raised basement in the Late Gothic Revival style. A rear addition was built in 1953. It features stone arched entryways, stone two-story bay, and crenellated battlement with four small towers. The school was named after Temple University dean Laura H. Carnell.

The building was added to the National Register of Historic Places in 1988.

References

External links

School buildings on the National Register of Historic Places in Philadelphia
Gothic Revival architecture in Pennsylvania
School buildings completed in 1931
Northeast Philadelphia
Public elementary schools in Philadelphia
School District of Philadelphia